Charsadda may refer to:

Charsadda, a city in Pakistan
Charsadda Tehsil, Pakistan
Charsadda District, Pakistan, Pakistan
Charsadda District (Afghanistan), in Ghor Province, Afghanistan